Bahiyal is an area located in Gandhinagar, India.

References srkbahiyal
srkbahiyal

Neighbourhoods in Ahmedabad